These are the Record World number-one albums of 1969.

Chart

References

American music-related lists